The Chiang Kai-shek Memorial Song was written to commemorate the Generalissimo and late President Chiang Kai-shek of the Republic of China. There are two songs: the second song was written by Hwang Yau-tai or Huang Youdi, Huang Yu-ti (黃友棣) in 1975, who later also wrote Chiang Ching-kuo Memorial Song in 1988.

The song was formerly popular for school choir competitions as students were required to memorise it. Since the 1990s, under the presidency of Lee Teng-hui, it has fallen into disuse, though most of the population still knows it. The song was also played daily in the National Chiang Kai-shek Memorial Hall every morning until 2017. Occasionally, it can be heard during political campaigns as well. It was also seen as one of the characteristics of Chiang's personality cult.

Official version
This was the officially adopted version of Chiang Kai-shek Memorial Song written by Li Chung-he and Zhang Ling.

Initial version

The initial version was written by 秦孝儀 (Chin Hsiao-I) and 黃友棣 (Hwang Yau-tai) shortly after Chiang's death. However this version was officially replaced by the officially adopted version written by Li Chung-he (李中和) and Zhang Ling (張齡).

Compared to the officially adopted version, this version was written in vernacular language and was longer in context.

See also
Chiang Kai-shek Memorial Song audio file
National Chiang Kai-shek Memorial Hall
Chiang Kai-shek statues
Cihu
Hwang Yau-tai

800 Heroes Song

Asian anthems
National symbols of Taiwan
Cultural depictions of Chiang Kai-shek
Chinese patriotic songs
Songs about military officers
Songs about presidents